The 2020 World Junior Speed Skating Championships took place from 21 to 23 February 2020 in Tomaszów Mazowiecki, Poland.

Schedule
All times are local (UTC+1).

Medal summary

Medal table

Men's events

Women's events

References

External links
Official website
Results

2020
World Junior Speed Skating Championships
International speed skating competitions hosted by Poland
2020
World Junior Speed Skating Championships
2020 in youth sport